Between Silk and Cyanide: A Codemaker's War 1941–1945 is a memoir of public interest by former Special Operations Executive (SOE) cryptographer Leo Marks, describing his work including memorable events, actions and omissions of his colleagues during the Second World War. It was first published in 1998.

Date
The book was written in the early 1980s. It was published on UK Government approval in 1998.

Title
The title is derived from an incident related in the book, when Marks was asked why agents in occupied Europe should have their cryptographic material printed on silk (which was in very short supply).  He summed his reply up by saying that it was "between silk and cyanide", meaning that it was a choice between the agent's surviving by making reliable coded radio transmissions with the help of the printed silk, and having to take a suicide pill to avoid being tortured into revealing the code and other secret information. Unlike paper, given away by rustling, silk is not detected by a casual or typical body search if concealed in the lining of clothing.

SOE 
A major theme is Marks's inability to convince his superiors in the Special Operations Executive (SOE) that apparent mistakes made in radio transmissions from agents working with or in an alike role as the Dutch resistance were their prearranged duress codes, which it transpired they were as he alleged, and which fact haunted him. SOE management, unwilling to face the possibility that their Dutch network was compromised, insisted that the errors were attributable to poor operation by the recently trained Morse code operators and continued to parachute in new agents to sites prearranged with the compromised network, leading to their immediate capture and later execution by the order of the command of Nazi Germany.

Marks' interest in cryptography arose from reading Edgar Allan Poe's The Gold-Bug as a child. Furthermore, his father Benjamin was a partner in bookshop Marks & Co at 84 Charing Cross Road. As a boy, Leo had begun his code-breaking with that used by his father, in noting the prices paid for second-hand books.

References

Cryptography books
HarperCollins books
1998 non-fiction books
World War II memoirs